How to Bake Pi is a popular mathematics book by Eugenia Cheng published in 2015. Each chapter of the book begins with a recipe for a dessert, to illustrate the methods and principles of mathematics and how they relate to one another. The book is an explanation of the foundations and architecture of category theory, a branch of mathematics that formalizes mathematical structure and its concepts.

References 

 
 
 

2015 non-fiction books
Popular mathematics books
Basic Books books